Fabio Cassanelli is an Italian Table football player. He is a multiple world champion. 
Partnering with Francesco Bonanno, he has won the gold medal for Disabled Doubles category at the ITSF World Championship (Nantes) in 2008, 2009, 2010, 2011, 2012 and is titleholder of the World CUP 2013.

References

External links 
Profile on the site table-soccer.org

World champions in table football
Table football
1973 births
Living people